This is a list of schools in the city and county of Swansea, Wales.

Primary schools

Welsh medium primary schools
Ysgol Gynradd Gymraeg Bryniago
Ysgol Gynradd Gymraeg Brynymor
Ysgol Gynradd Gymraeg Gellionnen
Ysgol Gynradd Gymraeg Llwynderw
Ysgol Gynradd Gymraeg Lon-las
Ysgol Gynradd Gymraeg Pontybrenin
Ysgol Gynradd Gymraeg Tan-y-lan
Ysgol Gynradd Gymraeg Tirdeunaw
Ysgol Gynradd Gymraeg Y Cwm
Ysgol Gynradd Gymraeg Y Login Fach

Independent primary schools
Oakleigh House School

Secondary schools
Birchgrove Comprehensive School*
Bishop Gore School
Bishop Vaughan RC School
Bishopston Comprehensive School*
Cefn Hengoed Comprehensive School*
Daniel James Community School* (closed 2011)
Dylan Thomas Community School*
Gowerton Comprehensive School
Morriston Comprehensive School
Olchfa School
Pentrehafod Comprehensive School
Penyrheol Comprehensive School*
Pontarddulais Comprehensive School*
Cwmtawe School*

* Denotes an incomplete Secondary School which does not have a Sixth Form

Welsh medium secondary schools
Ysgol Gyfun Gymraeg Bryn Tawe
Ysgol Gyfun Gŵyr

Independent secondary schools
Ffynone House School
OneSchool Global UK

Special schools
Ysgol Crug Glas
Ysgol Pen-y-Bryn

Further and higher education establishments
Gower College Swansea
Swansea Metropolitan University
Swansea University

See also
Peace Mala
Swansea Bay Sea School

References
City and County of Swansea: List of Schools: 2006/2007''

 
Swansea-related lists
Swansea